Ladislav Beran (born February 8, 1967) is a Czech actor and choreographer.

Beran was born in Czechoslovakia. He was a choreographer for the film Rebelové (2001), and appeared as a drug dealer in the film Blade II (2002). He has also made an appearance in the superhero film Hellboy (2004), starring as Karl Ruprecht Kroenen. The latter two films were directed by Guillermo del Toro.

Filmography

External links

1967 births
Living people
Czech male film actors
Czech choreographers